Springfield Ponies was the primary name of minor league baseball teams based in Springfield, Massachusetts that played between 1893 and 1943. The team competed as the Ponies through its history except for single seasons as the Maroons (1895), Tips (1915), and Green Sox (1917); and three seasons each as the Rifles (1932, 1942–1943) and Nationals (1939–1941). The team played its home games at Pynchon Park (also known as Hampden Park).

The team was a member of several baseball leagues, including three that were known as the Eastern League. The team's longest tenure was in the second Eastern League, in which it played from 1916 to 1932. During most of its history, the team had no farm-team arrangement with a Major League Baseball team, as much of its history predated formal affiliations. When operating as the Rifles, the team was affiliated for one season with the New York Yankees (1932) and for one season with the New York Giants (1943). When operating as the Nationals, it was affiliated with the Washington Nationals for the 1939 season.

The team finished atop league standings three times at the end of a full regular season (1895, 1908, 1911) and once at the end of a truncated regular season (1932). The team won playoff series twice (1895 and 1927), although it played mostly in leagues without postseasons.

Three of the team's managers were later inducted to the National Baseball Hall of Fame in recognition of their major-league playing careers: Roger Connor (manager in 1902–1903), Billy Hamilton (manager in 1914), and Rabbit Maranville (manager in 1941). Two fellow inductees played for Springfield late in their careers: Dan Brouthers (1896–1899) and Jim O'Rourke (1903, 1907). Brouthers had a .415 batting average in 126 games for the Ponies in 1897.

Earlier teams
Prior to 1893, teams from Springfield competed in six minor league seasons, each in a different league:
 1878 in the International Association
 1879 in the National Association
 1884 in the Massachusetts State Association
 1885 in the Southern New England League
 1887 in the Eastern League

These early teams were simply known as Springfield or the Springfields. The teams of 1879, 1885 and 1887 failed to complete their seasons.

Records by season
The following table lists each season between 1893 and 1943, when teams from Springfield competed primarily as the Ponies.

 designates a year in which the team's nickname was not Ponies: 1895 as Maroons, 1915 as Tips, 1917 as Green Sox, 1939–1941 as Nationals, and 1932/1942/1943 as Rifles.

See also
Springfield Cubs, a baseball team based in Springfield from 1948 to 1953
Springfield Green Sox players
Springfield Maroons players
Springfield Nationals players
Springfield Ponies players
Springfield Rifles players
Springfield Tips players

References

1893 establishments in Massachusetts
1934 disestablishments in Massachusetts
Baseball teams established in 1893
Baseball teams disestablished in 1934
Defunct baseball teams in Massachusetts
Defunct Eastern League (1938–present) teams
Defunct minor league baseball teams
Northeastern League teams
Professional baseball teams in Massachusetts
Ponies
Connecticut League teams